Michael Haydn's Symphony No. 8 in D major, Perger 38, Sherman 8, Sherman-adjusted 10, MH 69, is believed to have been written in Salzburg, some time after 1764.

Scored for flute, 2 oboes, 2 bassoons, 2 horns, 2 trumpets, timpani and strings, in four movements:

Allegro molto
Andante, in G major
Menuetto with Trio in D minor
Presto

The Andante and Menuetto feature significant parts for solo bassoon.  The Presto finale calls for solo roles for clarinet, bassoon and horn.

References
 A. Delarte, "A Quick Overview Of The Instrumental Music Of Michael Haydn" Bob's Poetry Magazine November 2006: 34 (PDF)
 Charles H. Sherman and T. Donley Thomas, Johann Michael Haydn (1737 - 1806), a chronological thematic catalogue of his works. Stuyvesant, New York: Pendragon Press (1993)
 C. Sherman, "Johann Michael Haydn" in The Symphony: Salzburg, Part 2 London: Garland Publishing (1982): lxiv

Symphony 08
Compositions in D major